Irvington is a township in Essex County, in the U.S. state of New Jersey. As of the 2020 United States census, the township's population was 61,176, an increase of 7,250 (+13.4%) from the 2010 census count of 53,926, which in turn reflected a decline of 6,769 (−11.2%) from the 60,695 counted in the 2000 census.

The township had the ninth-highest property tax rate in New Jersey in 2020, with an equalized rate of 4.890% in 2020, compared to 2.824% in the county as a whole and a statewide average of 2.279%.

History
Clinton Township, which included what is now Irvington, Maplewood and parts of Newark and South Orange, was created on April 14, 1834. The area was known as Camptown until the mid-1800s. In 1850, after Stephen Foster published his ballad, Camptown Races, residents were concerned that the activities described in the song would be associated with their community. The town was renamed, Irvingtown, in honor of Washington Irving.

Irvington was incorporated as an independent village on March 27, 1874, from portions of Clinton Township. What remained of Clinton Township was absorbed into Newark on March 5, 1902. On March 2, 1898, Irvington was incorporated as a Town, replacing Irvington Village. In 1982, the town was one of four Essex County municipalities to pass a referendum to become a township, joining 11 municipalities that had already made the change, of what would ultimately be more than a dozen Essex County municipalities to reclassify themselves as townships in order take advantage of federal revenue sharing policies that allocated townships a greater share of government aid to municipalities on a per capita basis.

From 1887 to 1965, Irvington was home to Olympic Park, a  amusement park that straddled the border of Irvington and Maplewood, with the main entrance on Chancellor Avenue and a side entrance on 40th Street. After the park closed, the merry-go-round was sold and transported to Disney World, in Orlando, FL. The book, Smile: A Picture History of Olympic Park, 1887–1965 written by Alan A. Siegel was published in 1983 by Rutgers University Press.

The 1967 Newark riots hastened an exodus of families from that city, many of them moving a few short blocks into neighboring Irvington. Until 1965, Irvington was almost exclusively white. By 1980, the town was nearly 40% black; by 1990 it was 70%.

On July 1, 1980, Fred Bost, was sworn in as East Ward Councilman, making him the first black person to serve on the Town Council. At age 24, Michael G. Steele became the first black elected to public office in Irvington when he won a seat on the school board on March 25, 1980, then became the township's first black mayor ten years later, when he was elected in 1990 and served for four years, followed by Sarah Brockington Bost in 1994. In 1994 Steele returned to the Board of Education to pursue his career as the district's certified School Business Administrator, serving over 22 years. The current Mayor is Tony Vauss.

Geography
According to the United States Census Bureau, the township had a total area of 2.92 square miles (7.55 km2), including 2.91 square miles (7.55 km2) of land and <0.01 square miles (0.01 km2) of water (0.07%).

The Elizabeth River runs through the city passing Civic Square and Clinton Cemetery. Unincorporated communities, localities and place names located partially or completely within the township include Irving Place.

The township is bordered by Maplewood to the west and Newark to the east, both in Essex County, and Hillside to the south and Union to the southwest, both in Union County, New Jersey.

Demographics

2020 census

2010 census

The Census Bureau's 2006–2010 American Community Survey showed that (in 2010 inflation-adjusted dollars) median household income was $42,580, and the median family income was $50,798. Males had a median income of $38,033 versus $36,720 for females. The per capita income for the township was $20,520. About 14.4% of families and 16.8% of the population were below the poverty line, including 24.4% of those under age 18 and 16.7% of those age 65 or over.

2000 census
As of the 2000 United States census there were 60,695 people, 22,032 households, and 14,408 families residing in the township. The population density was 20,528.3 people per square mile (7,917.1/km2). There were 24,116 housing units at an average density of 8,156.5 per square mile (3,145.7/km2). The racial makeup of the township was 81.66% Black or African American, 8.97% White, 0.24% Native American, 1.10% Asian, 0.10% Pacific Islander, 3.68% from other races, and 4.24% from two or more races. Hispanic or Latino of any race were 8.38% of the population.

As part of the 2000 Census, 81.66% of Irvington's residents identified themselves as being Black or African American. This was one of the highest percentages of African American people in the United States, and the third-highest in New Jersey (behind Lawnside at 93.6%, and East Orange at 89.46%) of all places with 1,000 or more residents identifying their ancestry.

There were 22,032 households, out of which 33.9% had children under the age of 18 living with them, 30.2% were married couples living together, 27.6% had a female householder with no husband present, and 34.6% were non-families. 29.3% of all households were made up of individuals, and 6.4% had someone living alone who was 65 years of age or older. The average household size was 2.74 and the average family size was 3.39.

In the township the age distribution of the population shows 28.0% under the age of 18, 10.7% from 18 to 24, 32.3% from 25 to 44, 21.5% from 45 to 64, and 7.5% who were 65 years of age or older. The median age was 32 years. For every 100 females, there were 87.7 males. For every 100 females age 18 and over, there were 81.5 males.

The median income for a household in the township was $36,575, and the median income for a family was $41,098. Males had a median income of $32,043 versus $27,244 for females. The per capita income for the township was $16,874. About 15.8% of families and 17.4% of the population were below the poverty line, including 22.9% of those under age 18 and 12.2% of those age 65 or over.

Crime
Irvington experienced the crack epidemic of the 1980s and has struggled with its aftermath. The township's violent crime rate was six times higher than New Jersey overall and the murder rate eight times higher than statewide statistics. In 2007, the New Jersey State Police reported that Irvington had a violent crime rate of 22.4 incidents per 1,000 population, the highest of all 15 major urban areas in the state.

According to the New Jersey State Police Uniform Crime Report for 2013, year-to-year between 2012 and 2013, Irvington experienced an overall reduction in crime of 9% (from 49.6 to 45.2 incidents per 1,000), with reductions coming from overall non-violent crime (18%) and aggravated assault (22%), but an increase in the violent crime rate of 16% from 13.1 incidents per 1,000 to 15.3.

Economy

Portions of the township are part of an Urban Enterprise Zone (UEZ), one of 32 zones covering 37 municipalities statewide. Irvington was selected in 1996 as one of a group of seven zones added to participate in the program. In addition to other benefits to encourage employment and investment within the UEZ, shoppers can take advantage of a reduced 3.3125% sales tax rate (half of the % rate charged statewide) at eligible merchants. Established in May 1996, the township's Urban Enterprise Zone status expires in May 2027.

In July 2015, the central business district surrounding the Irvington Bus Terminal on Springfield Avenue was designated as one of 33 transit villages statewide, qualifying it for incentives for revitalization.

Government

Local government
Irvington is governed within the Faulkner Act, formally known as the Optional Municipal Charter Law, under the Mayor-Council form of municipal government, one of 71 municipalities (of the 564) statewide that use this form. The governing body is comprised of the Mayor and the seven-member Township Council, whose members are elected to staggered four-year terms of office on a non-partisan basis in municipal elections held on the second Tuesday in May in even-numbered years. The mayor and the three at-large seats are elected together and two years later the four ward seats are up for vote together. The council selects a president, first vice president and second vice president from among its members at a reorganization meeting held after each election. The council is the legislative body of the township and needs a ⅔ majority to make changes to the budget submitted by the mayor. The mayor is the township's chief executive and is responsible for overseeing the day-to-day operations and submitting a budget, but is not eligible to vote on the council and is not required to attend its meetings.

, the mayor of Irvington is Tony Vauss, whose term of office ends June 30, 2026. Members of the Township Council are Council President Renee C. Burgess (At-large, 2026), Council First Vice President Octavio Hudley (At-large, 2026), Council Second Vice President Charnette Frederic (At-large, 2026), Jamillah Z. Beasley (South Ward, 2024), Vernal C. Cox Sr. (West Ward, 2024), Sean C. Evans (East Ward, 2024) and Orlander Glen Vick (North Ward, 2024).

In April 2019, Jamillah Z. Beasley was appointed to fill the South Ward seat expiring in December 2020 that became vacant following the death of Sandra M. Jones. He served on an interim basis until the November 2019 general election, when he was elected to serve the balance of the term of office.

Council President David Lyons, who had served six terms in office representing the North Ward, died in August 2019.

Federal, state and county representation
Irvington is located in the 10th Congressional District and is part of New Jersey's 28th state legislative district.

Politics
As of March 2011, there were 28,545 registered voters in Irvington, of which 14,694 (51.5%) were registered as Democrats, 404 (1.4%) were registered as Republicans and 13,442 (47.1%) were registered as Unaffiliated. There were 5 voters registered to other parties such as the Libertarian Party and Green Party.

In the 2012 presidential election, Democrat Barack Obama received 97.9% of the vote (18,538 cast), ahead of Republican Mitt Romney with 1.9% (363 votes), and other candidates with 0.2% (38 votes), among the 19,036 ballots cast by the township's 30,744 registered voters (97 ballots were spoiled), for a turnout of 61.9%. In the 2008 presidential election, Democrat Barack Obama received 96.9% of the vote (18,923 cast), ahead of Republican John McCain with 2.5% (493 votes) and other candidates with 0.1% (29 votes), among the 19,533 ballots cast by the township's 28,879 registered voters, for a turnout of 67.6%. In the 2004 presidential election, Democrat John Kerry received 91.8% of the vote (14,885 ballots cast), outpolling Republican George W. Bush with 7.3% (1,189 votes) and other candidates with 0.3% (80 votes), among the 16,211 ballots cast by the township's 26,594 registered voters, for a turnout percentage of 61.0.

In the 2013 gubernatorial election, Democrat Barbara Buono received 86.4% of the vote (6,800 cast), ahead of Republican Chris Christie with 13.1% (1,028 votes), and other candidates with 0.5% (42 votes), among the 8,030 ballots cast by the township's 31,292 registered voters (160 ballots were spoiled), for a turnout of 25.7%. In the 2009 gubernatorial election, Democrat Jon Corzine received 93.2% of the vote (9,218 ballots cast), ahead of Republican Chris Christie with 4.6% (459 votes), Independent Chris Daggett with 0.9% (93 votes) and other candidates with 0.7% (66 votes), among the 9,894 ballots cast by the township's 28,189 registered voters, yielding a 35.1% turnout.

Town of Irvington v. Elouise McDaniel
In 2022, Irvington sued local resident Elouise McDaniel, 82, accusing her of harassment and bullying by using her rights under New Jersey's Open Public Records Act. Both Mayor Vauss and Municipal Clerk Harold Wiener denied filing the lawsuit when interviewed, with Wiener commenting "She does file a lot of OPRAs. That comes with the territory, my territory. I know Ms. McDaniel. I don’t have a problem with her." After being the first to report on the story, WNBC was sent two cease and desist letters by the township, accusing them of harassment as well. After the lawsuit became widely publicized, Irvington dropped it.

Education
The Irvington Public Schools serve students in pre-kindergarten through twelfth grade. The district is one of 31 former Abbott districts statewide that were established pursuant to the decision by the New Jersey Supreme Court in Abbott v. Burke which are now referred to as "SDA Districts" based on the requirement for the state to cover all costs for school building and renovation projects in these districts under the supervision of the New Jersey Schools Development Authority. As of the 2019–20 school year, the district, comprised of 12 schools, had an enrollment of 8,020 students and 530.0 classroom teachers (on an FTE basis), for a student–teacher ratio of 15.1:1. Schools in the district (with 2019–20 enrollment data from the National Center for Education Statistics) are 
Augusta Preschool Academy (with 341 students; in Pre-K), 
Berkeley Terrace School (387; Pre-K–5), 
Chancellor Avenue School (527; K–5), 
Florence Avenue School (672; K–5), 
Grove Street School (428; Pre-K–5), 
Madison Avenue School (410; Pre-K–5), 
Thurgood G. Marshall School (398; Pre-K–5), 
Mount Vernon Avenue School (542; K–5), 
University Elementary School (403; K–5), 
Union Avenue Middle School (778; 6–8), 
University Middle School (403; 6–8) and
Irvington High School (1,558; 9–12). The district's high school was the 309th-ranked public high school in New Jersey out of 328 schools statewide in New Jersey Monthly magazine's September 2012 cover story on the state's "Top Public High Schools", after being ranked 287th in 2010 out of 322 schools listed.

Transportation

Roads and highways

The Garden State Parkway is the most significant highway in Irvington, passing through the center of the township; it is accessible from exits 143 and 144. Interstate 78 also passes through very briefly along the southeastern border at Exit 54. The most significant local roadway passing through Irvington is County Road 509.

Public transportation

The Irvington Bus Terminal, which underwent renovation in the early 2000s, is one of NJ Transit's (NJT) busiest facilities and regional transit hubs. Irvington is served by NJ Transit bus routes 107 to the Port Authority Bus Terminal in Midtown Manhattan; the 1, 13, 25, 27, 37, 39, 42, 70, 90 and 94 to Newark; and local service on the 26, 96. The 375 and the 107X also serves Irvington Bus Terminal as express routes..

Scheduled airline service is available at Newark Liberty International Airport in neighboring Newark and Elizabeth.

Notable people

People who were born in, residents of, or otherwise closely associated with Irvington include:

 Harold A. Ackerman (1928–2009), United States district judge of the United States District Court for the District of New Jersey
 Richie Adubato (born 1937), former NBA coach for the Detroit Pistons, Orlando Magic and Dallas Mavericks
 Paul Boris (born 1955), former pitcher for the Minnesota Twins
 Glen Burtnik (born 1955), singer, songwriter, entertainer and multi-instrumentalist, best known as a former member of the band Styx
 Asnage Castelly (born 1979), wrestler competing for Haiti at the 2016 Summer Olympics
 Cyrus Durand Chapman (1856–1918), artist and architect who achieved fame with his painting The Wedding Bonnet
 Rakeem Christmas (born 1991), basketball player for the Fort Wayne Mad Ants, on assignment from the Indiana Pacers of the NBA
 Josh Evans (born 1991), free safety who has played in the NFL for the Jacksonville Jaguars
 Vera Farmiga (born 1973), Academy Award-nominated actress, film director and producer
 Charles Goeller (1901–1955), artist best known for precise and detailed paintings and drawings
 Ina Golub (1938–2015), fiber artist specializing in Judaica
 Mike Goodson (born 1987), running back who has played in the NFL for the New York Jets
 Austin Gunsel (1909–1974), National Football League's interim commissioner following the death of Bert Bell on October 11, 1959
 William C. Hill (1917–1998), Associate Justice of the Vermont Supreme Court
 Frank Hiller (1920–1987), MLB pitcher from 1946 to 1953 who played for the New York Giants, Chicago Cubs, New York Yankees and Cincinnati Reds
 Erna Schneider Hoover (born 1926), mathematician notable for inventing a computerized telephone switching method
 James J. Howard (1927–1988), represented New Jersey's 3rd congressional district in the United States House of Representatives from 1965 to 1988
 Kareem Huggins (born 1986), running back for the Tampa Bay Buccaneers
 Sanford Hunt (1881–1943), member of the Cornell Big Red football team who was a consensus All-American at the guard position in 1901 and later an editor and director of The Newark Sunday Call
 Jeff Janiak (born 1976), vocalist of the punk rock band Discharge
 Jay W. Jensen (1931–2007), drama teacher
 Cullen Jones (born 1984), gold medal-winning swimmer at the 2008 Summer Olympics in Beijing in the Men's 4 × 100 m Freestyle Relay
 Ron Karnaugh (born 1966), former competition swimmer who represented the United States at the 1992 Summer Olympics
 Jack Kiley (1929–1982), professional basketball player who played for the Fort Wayne Pistons
 Martin E. Kravarik (1936–2018), politician who served in the New Jersey General Assembly from District 7B from 1970 to 1972
 Queen Latifah (born 1970), rapper, singer, actress, producer
 Jerry Lewis (1926–2017), comedian, actor, director
 Kevin Lyles (born 1973), former sprinter
 Boris Malenko (1933–1994), professional wrestler and professional wrestling trainer
 Adrienne A. Mandel (born 1936), politician who represented the 19th District in the Maryland House of Delegates for more than ten years
 John J. Miller Jr. (1923–2012), politician who served in the New Jersey General Assembly from 1962 to 1964.
 Percy A. Miller Jr. (1899–1984), politician who served as Speaker of the New Jersey General Assembly and was Mayor of Irvington from 1934 to 1938
 Joe Morello (1928–2011), drummer best known for his work with The Dave Brubeck Quartet
 Raheem Morris (born 1976), former head coach of the Tampa Bay Buccaneers
 Sybil Moses (–2009), prosecutor of the "Dr. X" Mario Jascalevich murder case and New Jersey Superior Court judge
 Frank Muehlheuser (1926–2006), American football fullback and linebacker who played in the NFL for the Boston Yanks and New York Bulldogs
 Al-Quadin Muhammad (born 1995), defensive end for the New Orleans Saints of the National Football League
 Napoleon (born 1977), rapper known for being a former member of Tupac Shakur's group, the Outlawz
 Rocco Neri (1919–2011), politician who served as a member of the New Jersey General Assembly from 1974 to 1976
 Blanche Noyes (1900–1981), pioneering female aviator who was among the first ten women to receive a pilot's license
 Bob Perina (1921–1991), running back, quarterback and defensive back who played in the NFL for five seasons
 Fabiana Pierre-Louis (born 1980), lawyer who was nominated in June 2020 to serve on the New Jersey Supreme Court
 Pras (born 1972), rapper, record producer, songwriter and actor, best known as one of the founding members of the Fugees
 Kenneth Raffa (born 1950), entomologist
 Robert Randolph (born 1977), singer and guitarist for Robert Randolph & the Family band
 Nicholas Reale (1922–1984), watercolorist with a lengthy career in art and teaching
 Nate Robinson (born 1985), former football defensive tackle
 Mark Rudd (born 1947), educator and anti-war activist
 Al Santorini (born 1948), former MLB pitcher who played for the Atlanta Braves, San Diego Padres and St. Louis Cardinals
 O. K. Sato (1871–1921), vaudeville performer best known for his comedic juggling
 Artie Schroeck (born 1938), composer and arranger
 Art Sinsabaugh (1924–1983), photographer
 Craig A. Stanley (born 1955), politician who served in the New Jersey General Assembly from 1996 to 2008, where he represented the 28th Legislative District
 Gary Saul Stein (born 1933),  attorney and former Associate Justice of the New Jersey Supreme Court, who served for 17 years where he wrote over 365 published opinions
 Wilbur Summers (1954–2019), American football punter who played in the NFL for the Detroit Lions
 Kay Sutton (1915–1988), film actress
 Travis Taylor (born 1990), professional basketball player
 Bill Wenzel (1918–1987), cartoonist best known as a widely published good girl artist for men's magazines
 Lewis Yablonsky (1924–2014), sociologist, criminologist, author, and psychotherapist best known for his innovative and experiential work with gang members
 Robert Zoellner (1932–2014), investor and stamp collector who was the second person to have assembled a complete collection of United States postage stamps
 Tony Zuzzio (1916–2002), lineman who played for the Detroit Lions during the 1942 NFL season

References

External links

 Township of Irvington homepage
 Irvington Public Schools
 
 School Data for the Irvington Public Schools, National Center for Education Statistics
 
 Irvington Public Works: trash & recycling schedule

 
1874 establishments in New Jersey
Faulkner Act (mayor–council)
New Jersey Urban Enterprise Zones
Populated places established in 1874
Townships in Essex County, New Jersey